Mary Jeff (1873-1941) was a Scottish activist and politician who was involved in the Glasgow rent strike.

Early life and education
Mary Jeff was born Mary Russell Watson in Coatbridge, Lanarkshire in 1873. She moved to Govan in 1896, and lived there with her husband, printer Andrew Jeff, and their three sons.

Community Activism and Political career
Mary and her husband were active in their community. They both had a key role in the Govan rent strike, Andrew as chair of the South Govan Tenants Committee, and Mary as part of the group of women who campaigned against eviction, and orchestrated the defence against bailiffs. Other women involved in this activity were Mary Barbour, Agnes Dollan, Mary Laird and Helen Crawfurd. She was a member of the Kinning Park Co-operative Women's Guild and the chairwoman of the Ladies section of the Govan War Memorial Committee. Two of her three sons had served in World War I, one of whom died.

She was elected to Govan parish council in 1919, and served until at least 1926, on both the Children's Committee and the Relief Committee.

In later years, she moved to Milngavie, where she was a member of Milngavie Bowling Club and an active member of the Deacon's court of St Luke's Church of Scotland.

She died in 1941 in Milngavie, and was buried in Old Monkland Cemetery.

References

1873 births
1946 deaths
Politicians from North Lanarkshire
Women councillors in Glasgow
Scottish Labour councillors
People from Coatbridge
People from Milngavie
Govan
Co-operative Women's Guild